Eggan is a surname. Notable people with the surname include:

 Dorothy Way Eggan (1901–1965), American anthropologist
 Fred Eggan (1906–1991), American anthropologist, husband of Dorothy
 Kevin Eggan (born 1974), American biologist

See also
 Egan (surname)